Mary Ann Brigham  (6 December 1829 – 29 June 1889) was an American educator who was the 8th President (President Elect) of Mount Holyoke College in 1889. After a teaching for a few years, "she was elected President of Mount Holyoke Seminary and College in 1889, but died in a railway accident before she could take up her appointment."

Biography
Mary Ann Brigham was born 6 December 1829 in Westborough, Massachusetts to Dexter Brigham and Mary Ann (Gould) Brigham. She was a descendant of Thomas Brigham and Edmund Rice, early immigrants to Massachusetts Bay Colony. She was educated at Mount Holyoke Female Seminary, as part of the 1849 class.

Brigham began her academic career in 1855, teaching at Mount Holyoke. In 1858 she was named assistant principal at Ingham University, remaining in that post until 1863. From 1863 to 1889 she served as a teacher and associate principal at Brooklyn Heights Seminary. She served for several years as president of the Mt. Holyoke Alumnae Club in New York City, and shortly after the 1888 charter of Mount Holyoke College, she was elected as 8th President of her alma mater. On 29 June 1889, as she was traveling from New York to South Hadley, Massachusetts to assume her post, the train crashed at New Haven, Connecticut. She died in the wreck. In 1897 a dormitory was erected by the New York Alumnae Club on the Mt. Holyoke campus. It was named The Mary Brigham Hall.

References

Mount Holyoke College faculty
Presidents and Principals of Mount Holyoke College
1829 births
1889 deaths
Women heads of universities and colleges
People from Westborough, Massachusetts
Mount Holyoke College alumni